is a town located in Nagaoka District, Kōchi Prefecture, Japan.

Geography
Ōtoyo is located in northeastern Kōchi Prefecture on the island of Shikoku. The Yoshino River and the Ananai River flow through the town, which extends 32 kilometers from east to west and 28 kilometers from north to south. The elevation is between 200 and 1,400 meters.

Neighbouring municipalities 
Kōchi Prefecture
 Kami
 Motoyama
Tokushima Prefecture
 Miyoshi
Ehime Prefecture
 Shikokuchūō

Climate
Ōtoyo has a Humid subtropical climate (Köppen Cfa) characterized by warm summers and cool winters with light snowfall.  There are significant differences in the weather depending on the topography. but since Ōtoyo is a heavy rainfall area in general, the annual rainfall reaches 3,000mm in some places, causing landslides and other disasters. The annual average temperature is 14°C.

Demographics
Per Japanese census data, the population of Ōtoyo has declined precipitously since the 1960s.  It is the only municipality in Shikoku where over 50% of the population is aged over 65, therefore qualifying as a genkai shūraku.

History 
As with all of Kōchi Prefecture, the area of Ōtoyo was part of ancient Tosa Province. During the Edo period, the area was part of the holdings of Tosa Domain ruled by the Yamauchi clan from their seat at Kōchi Castle. The area was organized into villages within  Nagaoka District with the creation of the modern municipalities system on April 1, 1889, including Higashitoyonaga, Nishitoyonaga, Ōsugi, and Tentsubo. These four villages merged on March 31, 1955  to form the village of Ōtoyo. Following this, a section of Ōtoyo was absorbed into the town of Tosayamada (present day Kami, Kōchi). On the April 1, 1972, the village became a town.

Government
Ōtoyo has a mayor-council form of government with a directly elected mayor and a unicameral town council of ten members. Ōtoyo, together with the other municipalities of Nagaoka and Tosa Districts,  contributes one member to the Kōchi Prefectural Assembly. In terms of national politics, the town is part of Kōchi 1st district of the lower house of the Diet of Japan.

Economy
The economy of Ōtoyo is centered on forestry.

Education
Ōtoyo has one public combined elementary/middle school operated by the town government. The town does not have a high school.

Transportation

Railway
 JR Shikoku - Dosan Line
  -  -  - -  -  -

Highways 
  Kōchi Expressway

Local attractions

Historic Sites
Buraku-ji, Buddhist temple whose Yakushi-do is a National Important Cultural Property
 former Tajikawa Domain Bansho Shoin, National Important Cultural Property

Events 
Osugi Summer Festival
Otaguchi Summer Festival
Wild Game Festival
Fukujuso Flower Festival

Tourist sites 
 , Special Natural Monument
 
 Whitewater Rafting - Due to its prime location on the Yoshino River and its proximity to Oboke Gorge Otoyo is the location of a large number of rafting companies.

Local products 
Goishicha (fermented tea)
Yuzu lemon juice
 Wild Game

Notable people from Ōtoyo 
Tomoyuki Yamashita, general in the Imperial Japanese Army
Masaya Tokuhiro,manga artist

References

External links

  

Towns in Kōchi Prefecture
Ōtoyo, Kōchi